Das Supertalent Season 4 was the fourth season of Germany's Got Talent franchise. Season 4 began on 24 September 2010. The  first episode was screened on 24 September. The first episode had the best quotes of all seasons: 7,47 million viewers. The second episode the following day could even top that with 7,74 million viewers. The final was viewed by 10,07 million. The top 40 semi-finals began on 27 November. Freddy Sahin-Scholl won the competition and €100,000. Season 4 had approximately 40.700 applicants.

Semi-finals

Semi-finals summary 
 Buzzed Out

Semi-final 1 (November 27)
Guest Performer: Michael Hirte

Semi-final 2 (December 4)

Semi-final 3 (December 11)

Semi-final 4 (December 15)

Final (December 18)

Sources

Das Supertalent
RTL (German TV channel) original programming
2010 German television seasons